Iker Lecuona Gascón (born 6 January 2000) is a Spanish motorcycle racer, who currently competes in the 2022 Superbike World Championship for Honda Racing Corporation, on a CBR1000RR-R. He spent two seasons in MotoGP, from  to  with KTM Tech3.

Career

Moto2 World Championship

CarXpert Interwetten/Technomag Racing Interwetten (2016)
In 2016 
Lecuona made his debut in the Moto2 World Championship replacing the injured Dominique Aegerter in the CarXpert Interwetten team for two races; later in the season he rejoined the team as the permanent replacement for the same rider.

Garage Plus Interwetten (2017)
He suffered serious back and collarbone injuries in a crash during pre-season testing at Jerez and missed the first two races of the 2017 season. That season Lecuona managed his first point-scoring race at world championship level in the second to last race in Malaysia. He finished 35th in the standings in this rookie Moto2 season.

Swiss Innovative Investors (2018)
In the last race of the season, the Valencian Community motorcycle Grand Prix, Lecuona achieved his first world championship podium, finishing 2nd after fellow KTM rider Miguel Oliveira. A further 10 finishes in the point scoring ranks, 6 of which being Top 10 finishes resulted in Lecuona placing 12th in the championship standings.

American Racing (2019)
2019 saw him achieve a 2nd podium finish on world championship level. At the 2019 Thailand motorcycle Grand Prix Lecuona finished 3rd after fellow KTM rider Brad Binder and Luca Marini.

MotoGP World Championship

Tech3 (2019–2021)
Lecuona's first MotoGP outing happened during the 2019 season, after having been announced as a regular rider for the following season with Tech3. In the season finale at Valencia, he replaced Tech3 KTM rider Miguel Oliveira who could not participate after undergoing surgery. Lecuona did not finish the race after crashing and retiring on lap 13 of 27.

He was signed by Tech3 KTM for the 2020 season, after the surprise departure of Johann Zarco from the KTM Factory Team. Following Zarco's announcement, Brad Binder who was set to join Tech3, was promoted to the factory team, leaving the position at the satellite team next to Hafizh Syahrin vacant.

In 2020, Lecuona scored points in seven races, three times finishing in the top ten (9th in Aragón and Austria, and 10th in Styria). He was forced to sit out of the European Grand Prix in Valencia, due to Andorran quarantine rules for close contact with individuals who tested positive for the SARS-CoV-2 virus. His brother – with whom he lived in Andorra – and his personal assistant both tested positive for the virus on 3 November, meaning Lecuona was forced into a mandatory quarantine of 10 days minimum. Tech3 elected not to replace him on such short notice. Lecuona also missed the Valencian Grand Prix after he subsequently tested positive for the virus shortly before the beginning of the race weekend, and subsequently the Portuguese Grand Prix on the following weekend. KTM test rider Mika Kallio replaced Lecuona in Portugal.

In 2021, Lecuona remained with Tech3, as per their contract, which would expire at the end of the season. Since his teammate Miguel Oliveira was signed with the KTM Factory Racing Team, former Ducati factory rider Danilo Petrucci was signed to partner Lecuona on a one year contract. However, both Tech3 teammates were left without a ride for the 2022 season after Red Bull KTM Ajo teammates Remy Gardner and Raúl Fernández showed a dominant performance in the Moto2 World Championship, subsequently both being signed by Tech3 for the 2022 season.

Superbike World Championship
Following losing his seat in MotoGP, Lecuona secured a deal to join Honda’s factory Superbike effort for the 2022 Superbike World Championship, replacing the departing Álvaro Bautista.

Career statistics

Grand Prix motorcycle racing

By season

By class

Races by year
(key) (Races in bold indicate pole position, races in italics indicate fastest lap)

Superbike World Championship

By season

Races by year
(key) (Races in bold indicate pole position) (Races in italics indicate fastest lap)

* Season still in progress.

References

External links

2000 births
Living people
Spanish motorcycle racers
MotoGP World Championship riders
Moto2 World Championship riders
Sportspeople from Valencia
Tech3 MotoGP riders
Superbike World Championship riders